Han Weiguo (born January 1956) is a general (shang jiang) of the Chinese People's Liberation Army (PLA). He has been Commander of the PLA Ground Force from August 2017 to June 2021, and formerly served as the inaugural Commander of the Central Theater Command.

Biography
Originally from Jingxing County, Hebei, Han is a graduate of the PLA National Defense University. He served as the commander of the 12th Group Army, then in December 2013, the deputy commander of the Beijing Military Region (now defunct). He was promoted to lieutenant general in 2015. After the 2016 re-organization of the PLA, he was named Commander of the Central Theater Command; at that time he was only one of two lieutenant generals named to commander or commissar positions in the re-organized Theater Command structure. He was promoted to the rank of General on July 28, 2017. In August 2017, he commanded a military parade at Zhurihe Training Base in Inner Mongolia celebrating the 90th anniversary of the Nanchang Uprising and the founding of the People's Liberation Army, which marked the first time that a Chinese military parade had been held outside of the capital of Beijing. That same month, Han was named the commander of the PLA Ground Force, succeeding General Li Zuocheng.

In 2013, Han became a deputy to the 12th National People's Congress. In October 2017, he was elected as a member of the 19th Central Committee of the Communist Party of China.

On 20 August 2021, he was appointed vice chairperson of the National People's Congress Foreign Affairs Committee.

References

1956 births
Living people
People from Shijiazhuang
People's Liberation Army generals from Hebei
Commanders of Central Theater Command
Deputy commanders of the Beijing Military Region
Delegates to the 12th National People's Congress
PLA National Defence University alumni
Members of the 19th Central Committee of the Chinese Communist Party
20th-century Chinese military personnel
21st-century Chinese military personnel